Francisco Chaviano is a Cuban human rights activist and mathematics professor.

In 1994, he was the President of the Cuban National Council for Human Rights when he documented cases of people who disappeared or died while trying to leave Cuba. He was arrested in March 1994 and sentenced to 15 years in prison a year later by a military court.

Amnesty International listed him as a prisoner of conscience and said that his trial fell short of international standards.

He was released in August 2007 on parole after becoming Cuba's longest serving political prisoner.

References

Amnesty International prisoners of conscience held by Cuba
Cuban human rights activists
Living people
Opposition to Fidel Castro
Year of birth missing (living people)
Cuban prisoners and detainees